The Medford Nuggets / Rogues were a Minor League Baseball team based in Medford, Oregon. They were members of the Class D Far West League from 1948 through 1951.

Medford Nuggets
The Medford Nuggets formed part of the Far West League from 1948 through 1949.  They were an affiliate of the Brooklyn Dodgers in 1948 but were unaffiliated in 1949.  Some sources list the team as the Medford Dodgers in the 1948 season. The team played their home games at Jackson County Baseball Park (renamed "Miles Field" in 1969) in Medford.

Season-by-season Record

Future major leaguers
Glen Gorbous (1949)
Larry Shepard (1948)

Medford Rogues
The team name was changed to the Medford Rogues the following season, and played under that name from 1950 to 1951.
In the Rogue Valley, Medford's Bear Creek is a tributary of the Rogue River.

The Rogues were an affiliate of the New York Giants in 1950 and were unaffiliated in 1951. The team folded in 1951 when they were unable to find a new home field after the ballpark was destroyed in a mysterious fire following a night game on July 3.

Year-by-year record

Future major leaguers
Frank Lucchesi (1951)
Tommy Nelson (1950)

Later teams in Medford
The Medford franchise was known to have paved the way for future teams in the city like the Medford Giants, Medford Dodgers, and the Medford A's / Southern Oregon Timberjacks of the short-season Class A Northwest League.

The West Coast League, a collegiate summer baseball league, fielded a new franchise that began play in the summer of 2013 at Harry & David Field in Medford.

References

External links
Baseball Reference – Far West League Encyclopedia and History
Far West League Chart

Defunct Far West League teams
Defunct minor league baseball teams
New York Giants minor league affiliates
Defunct baseball teams in Oregon
Sports in Medford, Oregon
Brooklyn Dodgers minor league affiliates
Baseball teams established in 1948
1948 establishments in Oregon
1951 disestablishments in Oregon
Sports clubs disestablished in 1951
Baseball teams disestablished in 1951
Far West League teams